Ottis Steede (born 6 September 1974) is a Bermudian international footballer who plays club football for Dandy Town Hornets, as a midfielder. Steede represented Bermuda at the 1995 Pan American Games.

References

External links

1974 births
Living people
Association football midfielders
Bermudian footballers
Bermuda international footballers
PHC Zebras players
Dandy Town Hornets F.C. players
Pan American Games competitors for Bermuda
Footballers at the 1995 Pan American Games